Lady of the Mansion (Persian: بانوی عمارت‎, romanized: Banou-yeh Emarat) is an Iranian historical romance melodrama television series directed by Azizollah Hamidnezhad and written by Ehsan Javanmard, which aired on IRIB TV3 from 27 November 2018 to 6 January 2019 for 34 episodes.

Plot 
The lady of the mansion narrates a romantic melodrama at a time in the history of the Qajar period, in which the most important political event of that time, namely the assassination of Nasser al-Din Shah by Mirza Reza Kermani, is also discussed.

Cast 
 Hesam Manzour as Arsalan Mirza Quwanlu Qajar

 Maryam Momen as Fakhrolzaman Shalchi

 Pantea Panahiha as Afsarolmolouk

 Mina Vahid as Javaher

 Niki Nasirian as Ahoo

 Shabnam Farshadjoo as Mehral Nesae

 Alireza Shoja-e Noori as Tabibol Atbae

 Ramtin Khodapanaho as Mirza Asad Shalchi
 Mohammad Zarei as Younes

 Saleh Mirza Aghaei as Jahanbakhsh Mirza 

 Ghazal Shakeri as Behjatolmolouk

 Majid Saeedi as Yavar Sharifi

Reception

Awards and nominations

References

External links
 

2010s Iranian television series
Iranian television series
All articles with unsourced statements